Mark Andrew Visheau (born June 27, 1973 in Burlington, Ontario) is a retired professional hockey player who played briefly in the NHL with the Winnipeg Jets and the Los Angeles Kings between 1993 and 1999. He played defense and shot right-handed.

Visheau's imposing size (6'6, 235 lbs) made him a strong defenceman and a hot prospect. After playing with the London Knights of the OHL for two years Visheau was drafted by the Winnipeg Jets in the 4th round, 84th overall in the 1992 NHL Entry Draft. After being drafted Visheau returned to the Knights for one more year before joining the Moncton Hawks of the AHL for the 1993–94 season. Visheau also made his NHL debut that year, playing in one game with the Jets.

The next few years saw Visheau bounce around in the minors. He made stops with the Springfield Falcons, Minnesota Moose, Cape Breton Oilers, Quebec Rafales, and the Milwaukee Admirals among other teams. Visheau finally earned another shot in the NHL when he signed as a free agent with the Los Angeles Kings in 1997. For the 1998–99 season Visheau earned a spot on the Kings roster and played 28 games with the team. However, a urinary tract infection and surgical error in cutting his muscles during urinary tract surgery put an end to the season for Visheau. After missing the entire 1999–00 season, Visheau retired from hockey.

Career statistics

Regular season and playoffs

External links

1973 births
Living people
Canadian ice hockey defencemen
Cape Breton Oilers players
Ice hockey people from Ontario
London Knights players
Los Angeles Kings players
Milwaukee Admirals players
Minnesota Moose players
Moncton Hawks players
Quebec Rafales players
Raleigh IceCaps players
Sportspeople from Burlington, Ontario
Springfield Falcons players
Wheeling Thunderbirds players
Winnipeg Jets (1979–1996) draft picks
Winnipeg Jets (1979–1996) players